The 1980 Green Bay Packers season was their 62nd season overall and their 60th in the National Football League. The team posted a 5–10–1 record under coach Bart Starr, earning them a fifth-place finish in the NFC Central division.

Before the 1980 season even began, first-round draft pick Bruce Clark bolted directly for the Canadian Football League, never playing a down for the Packers. He forced a trade to the New Orleans Saints upon returning to the United States.
Green Bay regrouped and started strong by outlasting the Chicago Bears in an overtime thriller in the season opener. But with 27 players on injured reserved during the course of the year, the team was unable to replenish its roster and Green Bay suffered their 7th losing season in 8 years.

Exactly three months after the opener at Lambeau Field,  The Packers would rematch with the Bears. However, Chicago exacted revenge by embarrassing the Packers 7–61 at Soldier Field, causing the Packers to be eliminated from the playoffs for the 8th straight season.

Offseason

NFL draft

Undrafted free agents

Personnel

Staff

Roster

Regular season

Schedule

Standings

Game summaries

Week 1: vs. Chicago Bears

Week 2: vs. Detroit Lions

Week 3 vs. Los Angeles Rams
date=September 21, 1980
TV: CBS
TV Announcers: Gary Bender and John Madden

Week 4: vs. Dallas Cowboys

Week 11 vs. New York Giants

Awards and records

Hall of Famers
In 1980 Packer great Herb Adderley was inducted into the Pro Football Hall of Fame

References

Green Bay Packers seasons
Green Bay Packers
Green Bay